Theodore Ziolkowski (September 30, 1932 – December 5, 2020) was a scholar in the fields of German studies and comparative literature. He coined the term "fifth gospel genre".

Early life
Theodore J. Ziolkowski was born on September 30, 1932 in Birmingham, Alabama to Cecilia (née Jankowski) and Mieczysław Ziółkowski, second-generation and first-generation Polish immigrants to the United States. He received a Bachelor of Arts from Duke University in 1951, a Master of Arts from Duke University in 1952 and, following studies at the University of Innsbruck on a Fulbright Fellowship, his Ph.D from Yale University in 1957.

Personal life
Ziolkowski married Yetta Goldstein in 1951. Together they had two sons, Jan and Eric.

Career
Following appointments at Yale and Columbia, he was called to Princeton University as professor of German in 1964. In 1969 he was appointed Class of 1900 Professor of German and Comparative Literature and, from 1979 to 1992, Dean of the Graduate School. From 2001 to his death, he was professor emeritus. A past president of the Modern Language Association (1985) and visiting professor at several universities (Yale, CUNY, Rutgers, Bristol, Munich, Lueneburg), he received many awards for his books and honors in the United States and abroad, including the Goethe-Medaille of the Goethe-Institut, the Jacob-und-Wilhelm Grimm Preis (DAAD), the Forschungspreis of the Alexander von Humboldt Foundation, the Bundesverdienstkreuz (1. Klasse) of the Federal Republic of Germany, and the D.Phil.h.c. from the University of Greifswald. 

He was a member of the American Philosophical Society and the American Academy of Arts and Sciences. He was also a corresponding member of the Austrian Akademie der Wissenschaften, the Göttingen Akademie der Wissenschaften, and the Deutsche Akademie fur Sprache und Dichtung.

Awards
He received the James Russell Lowell Prize and the Henry Allen Moe Prize in the Humanities of the American Philosophical Society.

Death
Ziolkowski died in Kirkland Village, in Bethlehem, Pennsylvania, on December 5, 2020.

Works
1964. Hermann Broch
1965. The Novels of Hermann Hesse: Themes and Structures
1966. Hermann Hesse
1969. Dimensions of the Modern Novel: German Texts and European Contexts
1972. Fictional Transfigurations of Jesus (James Russell Lowell Prize of MLA)
1973, ed. Hesse: A Collection of Critical Essays.
1976, ed.Hermann Hesse: My Belief. Essays on Life and Art
1977. Disenchanted Images: A Literary Iconology
1979. Der Schriftsteller Hermann Hesse
1980. The Classical German Elegy, 1795–1950
1983. Varieties of Literary Thematics
1990. German Romanticism and Its Institutions
1991, ed. Soul of the Age: Letters of Hermann Hesse.
1993. Virgil and the Moderns.
1997. The Mirror of Justice: Literary Reflections of Legal Crises (Christian Gauss Award of Phi Beta Kappa).
1998. The View from the Tower. Origins of an Antimodernist Image. 
1998. Das Wunderjahr in Jena: Geist und Gesellschaft, 1794/95
2000. The Sin of Knowledge: Ancient Themes and Modern Variations.
2002. Berlin: Aufstieg einer Kulturmetropole um 18102004. Clio the Romantic Muse: Historicizing the Faculties in Germany (Barricelli Prize of International Conference on Romanticism)
2004. Hesitant Heroes: Private Inhibition, Cultural Crisis.
2005. Ovid and the Moderns (Robert Motherwell Award of Dedalus Foundation)
2006. Vorboten der Moderne: Eine Kulturgeschichte der Fruehromantik2006, ed. Friedrich Dürrenmatt: Selected Works: Vol. 2 Fiction2007  Modes of Faith: Secular Surrogates for Lost Religious Belief2008  Minos and the Moderns: Cretan Myth in Twentieth-Century Literature and Art2008  Mythologisierte Gegenwart: Deutsches Erleben seit 1933 in antikem Gewand2009  Heidelberger Romantik: Mythos und Symbol2009  Scandal on Stage: European Theater as Moral Trial2010  Die Welt im Gedicht. Rilkes Sonette an Orpheus II.42010  Dresdner Romantik: Politik und Harmonie2011, ed. Peter Hacks: Senecas Tod2011  Gilgamesh among Us: Modern Encounters with the Ancient Epic2013  Lure of the Arcane: The Literature of Cult and Conspiracy2015  Classicism of the Twenties: Art, Music, and Literature2015  The Alchemist in Literature: From Dante to the Present2016  Uses and Abuses of Moses: Literary Representations since the Enlightenment2017   Music into Fiction: Composers Writing, Compositions Imitated2018   Stages of European Romanticism: Cultural Synchronicity in the Arts, 1798-18482020   Roman Poets in Modern Guise: The Reception of Roman Poetry since World War IExternal links
"Science, Frankenstein, and Myth", Theodore Ziolkowski, The Sewanee Review, Winter 1981
"Gilgamesh: An Epic Obsession", Theodore Ziolkowski, Berfrois'', 1 November 2011
Official Page at Princeton

Notes

1932 births
2020 deaths
Writers from Birmingham, Alabama
Germanists
Duke University alumni
Yale University alumni
Officers Crosses of the Order of Merit of the Federal Republic of Germany
Members of the American Philosophical Society
Princeton University faculty
Professors of German in the United States
Presidents of the Modern Language Association